Volva volva is a species of sea snail, a marine gastropod mollusk in the family Ovulidae (false cowries). In Australia the shells are commonly referred to as a Shuttle or Spindle Egg Cowry.

Description
The canals are long and narrow, while the body whorl is about one-third or less of the shell length.

Distribution
Volva volva is found in the Pacific and Indian Oceans.

References

Ovulidae
Gastropods described in 1758
Taxa named by Carl Linnaeus